Dai dai shōgi (大大将棋 'huge chess') is a large board variant of shogi (Japanese chess).  The game dates back to the 15th century and is based on the earlier dai shogi.  Apart from its size, the major difference is in the range of the pieces and the "promotion by capture" rule. It is the smallest board variant to use this rule.

Because of the terse and often incomplete wording of the historical sources for the large shogi variants, except for chu shogi and to a lesser extent dai shogi (which were at some points of time the most prestigious forms of shogi being played), the historical rules of dai dai shogi are not clear. Different sources often differ significantly in the moves attributed to the pieces, and the degree of contradiction (summarised below with the listing of most known alternative moves) is such that it is likely impossible to reconstruct the "true historical rules" with any degree of certainty, if there ever was such a thing. It is not clear if the game was ever played much historically, as the few sets that were made seem to have been intended only for display.

Rules of the game

Objective 

The objective is to capture the opponent's king.  Unlike standard shogi, pieces may not be dropped back into play after being captured.

Game equipment 

Two players, Black and White (or sente and gōte), play on a board composed of squares in a grid of 17 ranks (rows) by 17 files (columns) with a total of 289 squares.  The squares are undifferentiated by marking or color.

Each player has a set of 96 wedge-shaped pieces of 64 different types.  In all, the players must remember 68 different moves.  The pieces are of slightly different sizes, from largest to smallest (or roughly most to least powerful) they are:

 1 King (King general/Jeweled general)
 1 Queen
 1 Rushing bird
 1 Free demon
 1 Free dream-eater
 1 Water buffalo
 1 Dragon king
 1 Dragon horse
 1 Square mover
 1 Racing chariot
 1 Rook
 1 Bishop
 1 Golden bird
 1 Great dragon
 1 Standard bearer
 1 Fragrant elephant
 1 White elephant
 1 Lion
 1 Lion dog
 1 Dove
 1 She-devil
 1 Blue dragon
 1 White tiger
 1 Right chariot
 1 Left chariot
 1 Phoenix
 1 Kirin
 1 Poisonous snake
 1 Old kite
 2 Violent oxen
 1 Flying dragon
 1 Enchanted fox
 1 Old rat
 1 Enchanted badger
 1 Flying horse
 1 Prancing stag
 2 Savage tigers
 1 Hook mover
 1 Long-nosed goblin
 1 Northern barbarian
 1 Southern barbarian
 1 Eastern barbarian
 1 Western barbarian
 1 Neighboring king
 1 Blind monkey
 2 Ferocious leopards
 2 Evil Wolves
 2 Violent bears
 1 Right general
 1 Left general
 2 Gold generals
 2 Silver generals
 2 Copper generals
 2 Iron generals
 2 Wood generals
 2 Stone generals
 2 Angry boars
 1 Cat sword
 2 Reverse chariots
 2 Lances
 2 Side movers
 1 Vertical mover
 2 Howling Dogs
 17 Pawns

Many of the English-language names are chosen to correspond to their rough equivalents in Western chess, not necessarily as translations of the Japanese names. (Sometimes the queen is called the "free king", a direct translation of its Japanese name. The kirin's name is sometimes anglicised as kylin.)

Each piece has its name in the form of two Japanese characters marked on its face. On the reverse side of some pieces are one or two other characters, often in a different color (e.g., red instead of black); this reverse side is used to indicate that the piece has been promoted during play. The pieces of the two sides do not differ in color, but instead each piece is shaped like a wedge, and faces forward, toward the opposing side. This shows who controls the piece during play.

Listed below are the pieces of the game and, if they promote, which pieces they promote to.

Table of pieces

Relatively few pieces promote (or demote) in dai dai shogi. A few pieces (*asterisked) only appear upon promotion.

† The first kanji of Howling Dog may not appear in some fonts. It is a combined 口 and 奇.
‡ The great elephant is mentioned as the promoted lion dog in the Shōgi Rokushu no Zushiki, but not in the other two Edo-era sources, when the lion dog does not promote.
†† The second character in 'wizard stork' is not present in most fonts: it should be 而 atop 鷦.

The queen could also be abbreviated FK (for free king) and the kirin as Ky (for kylin).

Setup 

Below is a diagram showing the setup of one player's pieces.  The way one player sees their own pieces is the same way the opposing player will see their pieces.

Game play 

The players alternate making a move, with Black moving first. (The traditional terms 'black' and 'white' are used to differentiate the sides during discussion of the game, but are not literally correct.)  A move consists of moving a piece on the board and potentially promoting the piece.  Each of these options is detailed below.

Promotion 
Unusually for a large-board shogi variant, only a minority of pieces (21 of 64) are able to promote. The rule for promotion in these larger games is different from smaller board variants.

A piece promotes at the end of its first capturing move. Promotion has the effect of changing how the piece moves (see the table above for what each piece promotes to), and is effected by turning the piece over after it moves, revealing the name of its promoted rank. Promotion for pieces able to do so is both compulsory and permanent.

This is very different from smaller shogi variants, where pieces promote when they cross a promotion zone (the enemy camp), and where promotion is optional. The dots on the dai dai shogi board that would represent promotion zones in other games only function as placement guides for the initial setup of the two camps.

Most promoting pieces promote to a piece that exists in the initial setup of the board. However, such a promoted piece cannot then promote a second time as its namesake does. For example, a lion promotes to a furious fiend. However, while an eastern barbarian promotes to a lion on its first capturing move, it does not further promote to a furious fiend on its second. Rather, it remains a lion for the rest of the game. This should be obvious from the game pieces, which only have two sides.

If a piece which is only able to move forward (a pawn, lance, stone general, wood general, or iron general) reaches the far rank, it is unable to move further and must remain there until captured.

The promoting pieces appear on the 2nd, 3rd, and 4th ranks of the initial setup. Pieces on the middle three files or the edge file do not promote. Most promoting pieces stand close to their promoted versions in the initial setup.

Movement and capture 

An opposing piece is captured by displacement: That is, if a piece moves to a square occupied by an opposing piece, the opposing piece is displaced and removed from the board. A piece cannot move to a square occupied by a friendly piece (meaning another piece controlled by the moving player).

Each piece on the game moves in a characteristic pattern. Pieces move either orthogonally (that is, forward, backward, left, or right, in the direction of one of the arms of a plus sign, +), or diagonally (in the direction of one of the arms of a multiplication sign, ×). The lion, lion dog, and furious fiend are exceptions, in that they do not move, or are not required to move, in a straight line.

If a piece that cannot retreat or move aside advances across the board until it can no longer move, it must remain there until captured. This applies to the pawn, lance, stone general, wood general, and iron general.

Many pieces are capable of several kinds of movement, with the type of movement most often depending on the direction in which they move. The movement categories are:

Step movers
Some pieces move only one square at a time. (If a friendly piece occupies an adjacent square, the moving piece may not move in that direction; if an opposing piece is there, it may be displaced and captured.)

Limited ranging pieces
Some pieces can move along a limited number (2, 3, or 5) of free (empty) squares along a straight line in certain directions. Other than the limited distance, they move like ranging pieces (see below).

Jumping pieces

Several pieces can jump, that is, they can pass over any intervening piece, whether friend or foe, with no effect on either. These are the lion, lion dog, kirin, phoenix, and poisonous snake.

Ranging pieces

Many pieces can move any number of empty squares along a straight line, limited only by the edge of the board. If an opposing piece intervenes, it may be captured by moving to that square and removing it from the board. A ranging piece must stop where it captures, and cannot bypass a piece that is in its way. If a friendly piece intervenes, the moving piece is limited to a distance that stops short of the intervening piece; if the friendly piece is adjacent, it cannot move in that direction at all.

Hook moves (changing tack)

The hook mover and long-nosed goblin (tengu) can move any number of squares along a straight line, as a normal ranging piece, but may also abruptly change tack left or right by 90° at any one place along the route, and then continue as a ranging piece. Turning a corner like this is optional.

The range covered by a hook move is the equivalent of two moves by a rook, or two moves by a bishop, depending the piece. However, a hook move is functionally a single move: The piece cannot capture twice in one move, nor may it capture and then move on. It must stop before an intervening piece (unless it first changes direction to avoid it), and must stop when it captures, just like any other ranging piece. It can only change direction once per move.

Lion moves (multiple captures)

The lion, lion dog, and furious fiend have sequential multiple-capture abilities, called "lion moves". The details of these powerful moves are described for the lion and lion dog, below.

Individual pieces

In the diagrams below, the different types of moves are coded by symbol and by color: Blue for step moves, yellow for jumps, green for multiple capture, and gray for range moves, as follows: 

Piece names with a grey background are present at the start of the game; the four with a blue background only appear with promotion. Betza's funny notation has been included in brackets for easier reference, with the extension that the notation xxxayyyK stands for an xxxK move possibly followed by an yyyK move, not necessarily in the same direction. By default continuation legs can go into all directions, but can be restricted to a single line by a modifier 'v' ("vertical", interpreted relative to the piece's current position on its path). The default modality of all legs is the ability to move and capture: other possibilities are specified explicitly. Thus while aK moves twice as a king and can capture on both its moves, mKaK moves twice as a king but must stop when it captures.

There are many divergent descriptions in the Edo-era sources; mostly, the rules from The Chess Variant Pages are followed below, with the exception of the great elephant. Some divergent moves are detailed in the footnotes.

Repetition 
A player may not make a move if the resulting position is one that has previously occurred in the game with the same player to move. This is called repetition (千日手 sennichite). Note that certain pieces have the ability to pass in certain situations (lions, lion dogs, and furious fiends). Such a pass move leaves the position unchanged, but it does not violate the repetition rule, as it will now be the turn of the other player to move. Of course, two consecutive passes are not possible, as the first player will see the same position as before.

However, evidence from chu shogi problems suggests that this at least does not apply to a player who is in check or whose pieces are attacked, as otherwise one could win via perpetual check or perpetual pursuit. The modern chu shogi rule as applied by the Japanese Chu Shogi Association (JCSA) is as follows, and presumably dai dai shogi should be similar. If one side is making attacks on other pieces (however futile) with his moves in the repeat cycle, and the other is not, the attacking side must deviate, while in case of checking the checker must deviate regardless of whether the checked side attacks other pieces. In the case of consecutive passes, the side passing first must deviate, making turn passing to avoid zugzwang pointless if the opponent is in a position where he can pass his turn too. Only the fourth repetition is forbidden by these rules. If none of these are applicable, repetition is a draw.

Check and mate 

When a player makes a move such that the opponent's king could be captured on the following move, the move is said to give check to the king; the king is said to be in check. If a player's king is in check and no legal move by that player will get the king out of check, the checking move is also a mate, and effectively wins the game.

Game end 

A player who captures the opponent's king wins the game. In practice this rarely happens; a player will resign when loss is inevitable and the king will be taken on the opponent's next move (as in International Chess) because of the tradition that it is seen as an embarrassment to lose.

A player who makes an illegal move loses immediately. (This rule may be relaxed in casual games.)

Game notation 

The method used in English-language texts to express shogi moves was established by George Hodges in 1976. It is derived from the algebraic notation used for chess, but differs in several respects.  Modifications have been made for dai dai shogi.

A typical example is P-8g.
The first letter represents the piece moved (see above).
Promoted pieces have a + added in front of the letter. (e.g., +BM for a mountain witch, or promoted blind monkey).  The designation of the piece is followed by a symbol indicating the type of move: - for an ordinary move or x for a capture.  Next is the designation for the square on which the piece lands.  This consists of a number representing the file and a lowercase letter representing the rank, with 1a being the top right corner (as seen from Black's point of view) and 17q being the bottom left corner.  (This method of designating squares is based on Japanese convention, which, however, uses Japanese numerals instead of letters. For example, the square 2c is denoted by 2三 in Japanese.)

If a lion captures by 'igūi’, the square of the piece being captured is used instead of the destination square, and this is preceded by the symbol '!'.  If a double capture is made, than it is added after the first capture.

If a capture mandates the player to promote the piece, then a + is added to the end to signify that the promotion was taken. For example, CSx7c+ indicates a cat sword capturing on 7c and promoting.

In cases where the above notation would be ambiguous, the designation of the start square is added after the designation for the piece in order to make clear which piece is meant.

Moves are commonly numbered as in chess.

Strategy

Piece values 
According to the German Chu Shogi Association, the average values of the pieces are (using the interpretations of The Shogi Association, e.g. the lion dog as only a three-square range mover with no lion power):

These average values do not take into account the special status of the king as a royal piece. They have also been normalized so that the pawn is worth 1 point to avoid fractions. Additionally, pieces gain in value if they have a good chance of promotion. This is particularly significant for the old kite and poisonous snake, which promote to the two most powerful pieces in the game.

See also 
 Shogi variant
 Wa shogi
 Chu shogi
 Heian dai shogi
 Dai shogi
 Tenjiku shogi
 Maka dai dai shogi
 Tai shogi
 Taikyoku shogi

References
 'Sho Shogi Zushiki', Nishzawa Teijin, 1694

Notes on pieces with conflicting descriptions
These descriptions are taken from Japanese Wikipedia, which references the Edo-era publications 象戯図式 Shōgi Zushiki (SZ), 諸象戯図式 Sho Shōgi Zushiki (SSZ), and 象棋六種之図式 Shōgi Rokushu no Zushiki (SRZ). The first two are generally though not always in agreement, but the third differs in the case of most pieces which are not found in smaller shogi variants.

External links 
 Dai Dai Shogi at The Chess Variant Pages
 Shogi Net
 history.chess/Daidai shōgi
 DaiDai Shogi games and strategy.
 Shogi Variants: Translation Notes (I) by Eric Silverman. Describes the problems associated with the moves of the furious fiend and great elephant in dai dai shogi. The move given here as the main option for the great elephant is based on this article.

Shogi variants